Cocculus orbiculatus, the queen coralbead, is a species of woody vines. It is found from India east to Java.

References

External links
 
 

orbiculatus
Plants described in 1817